Luke Elliot Plange (born 4 November 2002) is an English professional footballer who plays as a forward for Lincoln City on loan from  club Crystal Palace.

Club career
A youth product of Arsenal since the age of 6, Plange moved to Derby County on 21 March 2021. He made his professional debut with Derby County on 4 December 2021, coming on as a half-time substitute in a 1–0 EFL Championship defeat against Bristol City.

On 31 January 2022, Plange signed for Crystal Palace and was loaned back to Derby for the remainder of the season. In August 2022 he was loaned to Belgian club RWD Molenbeek, along with teammate Jake O'Brien, for the 2022–23 season. On 30 January 2023, Crystal Palace recalled him from his loan at RWD Molenbeek and sent on loan to Lincoln City for the remainder of the season.

International career
On 25 March 2022, Plange made his England U20 debut in a 2–0 defeat to Poland in Bielsko-Biała.

Career statistics

References

External links
 
 DCFC Profile

2002 births
Living people
Footballers from Kingston upon Thames
English footballers
England youth international footballers
Association football forwards
Arsenal F.C. players
Derby County F.C. players
Crystal Palace F.C. players
RWDM47 players
Lincoln City F.C. players
English Football League players
Challenger Pro League players
English expatriate footballers
Expatriate footballers in Belgium
English expatriate sportspeople in Belgium